
Sokołów County is a unit of territorial administration and local government (powiat) in Masovian Voivodeship, east-central Poland. It came into being on January 1, 1999, as a result of the Polish local government reforms passed in 1998.

As of 2019 its total population is 53,992, out of which the population of Sokołów Podlaski is 18,946, that of Kosów Lacki is 2,089, and the rural population is 32,957.

Neighbouring counties
Sokołów County is bordered by Ostrów Mazowiecka County and Wysokie Mazowieckie County to the north, Siemiatycze County to the east, Siedlce County to the south, and Węgrów County to the west.

Administrative division
The county is subdivided into nine gminas (one urban, one urban-rural and seven rural). These are listed in the following table, in descending order of population.

References

 
Land counties of Masovian Voivodeship